The Yeni Valide Mosque is an 18th-century Ottoman mosque in the Üsküdar district of Istanbul, Turkey.

History 
Construction of the Yeni Valide mosque in Üsküdar began in 1708 and was completed in 1710. It was built for sultan Ahmed III in honour of his mother Emetullah Râbi'a Gülnûş Sultan. The complex consists of an imaret (hospice), arasta, primary school, the tomb of Emetullah Râbi'a Gülnûş Sultan, a courtyard shadirvan (fountain), a muvakkithane (clock tower) and offices. The building is typical of the Classical Ottoman period and of the "Sinan School" of Ottoman religious architecture. It is located in the Üsküdar neighborhood of Istanbul. The main part of the building is square-shaped and covered with a flattened main dome and four half domes. The mosque has two minarets with two balconies each. Calligraphy inside the mosque is the work of Hezarfen Mehmet Efendi.

Exterior 
The mosque is walled off separating itself from the Uskudar district, the entrance being a large gateway. Inside of the walls the mosque's most famous aspect which can be seen from the outside as well, is the tomb that that has a unique bird cage like theme. It also has a courtyard with a notable fountain at its center that the public goes to for water to this day. In the courtyard the mosque has an abundance of different trees from plane to palm, as well as, chestnut.

The mosque has an octagonal base with a central dome. Its plan is a variant of that of the Rüstem Pasha Mosque, but variations such as its corner domes give it a more classical character than the Rüstem Pasha Mosque. It is also one of the earliest examples of the 18th-century trend towards domes that were proportionally higher and narrower. The cross vault over the central opening is an innovation first seen in this mosque. Rather than the five domes over the entrance portico – typical for Ottoman mosques – the Yeni Valide employs a cross vault over a central bay and cloister vaults over side bays. The interior decoration consists of stone carvings including muqarnas – intricate stone carvings with floral motifs – and tiles with repetitive floral patterns.

Interior 

Inside of the mosque, there is floral patterns and motifs. At the front there is a mihrab as well as a minbar for the Imam which is needed in mosques so the Imam can lead and direct the Muslim community during prayer. On the interior of the domed ceiling above it is seen that there is different Arabic scriptures written, specially in the calligraphy style of Thuluth. 

The windows of the mosque make use of both pointed and curved arches. Those below the domes are pointed, creating the visual effect of pushing the domes upwards. The windows in the domes have rounded arches, which creates the visual effect of the dome pushing downwards on the structure beneath. Both the entryway and the octagonal fountain (shadirvan) in the courtyard make liberal use of very detailed stone carvings and the tomb of Gülnûş features an open top and intricate metal latticework. The primary school is located above the north gate to the mosque complex.

See also 
 List of mosques
 Ottoman architecture
 Kulliyye

References

Further reading

  A scan is available from Archnet.
 Kuran, Aptullah. Sinan: The Grand Old Master of Ottoman Architecture. Washington, D.C.: Institute of Turkish Studies, Inc., 1987. 242.
 Kuban, Dogan. Ottoman Architecture. Woodbridge, Suffolk: Antique Collectors' Club Ltd, 2010. 384–86.

External links 

 Yeni Valide Complex at Üsküdar, Archnet 
 Images of the Yeni Valide Mosque
 Photos of the mosque by Dick Osseman

Religious buildings and structures completed in 1710
18th-century mosques
Ottoman mosques in Istanbul
Architecture in Turkey
Üsküdar
1710 establishments in the Ottoman Empire